Omana is a 1972 Indian Malayalam-language film, directed and produced by J. D. Thottan. The film stars Ravichandran, Prem Nazir, Sheela and Rani Chandra in the lead roles. The film had musical score by G. Devarajan.

Cast
Ravichandran
Prem Nazir
Sheela
Rani Chandra
Alummoodan
Sankaradi
Adoor Bhasi
Kousalya
Meena
Khadeeja

Soundtrack
The music was composed by G. Devarajan with lyrics by Vayalar Ramavarma.

References

External links
 

1972 films
1970s Malayalam-language films
Films directed by J. D. Thottan